Senator Bates may refer to:

Alan Bates (politician) (1945–2016), Oregon State Senate
David Bates (politician) (born 1941), Rhode Island State Senate
Edward Bates (1793–1869), Missouri State Senate
Erastus Newton Bates (1828–1898), Minnesota State Senate
Gail H. Bates (born 1945), Maryland State Senate
Henry C. Bates (1843–1909), Vermont State Senate
Henry M. Bates (1808–1865), Vermont State Senate
Isaac C. Bates (1779–1845), Massachusetts State Senate
Joshua Hall Bates (1817–1908), Ohio State Senate
Martin W. Bates (1786–1869), U.S. Senator from Delaware
Patricia Bates (born 1939), California State Senate
Sanford Bates (1884–1982), Massachusetts State Senate
William Gelston Bates (1803–1880), Massachusetts State Senate

See also
William B. Bate (1826–1905), U.S. Senator from New Jersey from 1807 to 1905
William J. Bate (1934–2011), New Jersey State Senate